The Cabinet of Sudan usually refers to the chief executive body of the Republic of the Sudan. The Cabinet was dissolved following the 11 April 2019 Sudanese coup d'état. Chapter 5 of the August 2019 Draft Constitutional Declaration defines the procedures which led to the nomination of Abdalla Hamdok as Prime Minister, and up to 20 Ministers in the Cabinet, during late August 2019, for the 39-month democratic transition. The Sudanese Women's Union protested against this. Under Article 19 of the Draft Constitutional Declaration, the ministers of the Transitional Cabinet are ineligible to run in the election scheduled to follow the transition period.

2019–2022 Transitional Cabinet

Background 
The 2018–19 Sudanese protests led to the 11 April 2019 Sudanese coup d'état which overthrew President Omar al-Bashir and dissolved his Cabinet. The Defense Minister who led the coup was removed on 14 April 2019.

Draft Constitutional Declaration
The sustained civil disobedience by Sudanese citizens that preceded the April coup d'état continued, in opposition to the Transitional Military Council (TMC). Negotiations between the TMC and the Forces of Freedom and Change alliance (FFC) led to the July Political Agreement and the August Draft Constitutional Declaration, which gave the FFC the choice of the ministers of the transitional government, with the sovereignty council holding the right to veto nominations, apart from the defence and interior ministers, who are to be selected by military members of the Sovereignty Council and appointed by the prime minister. Chapter 5 (Article 14) of the Draft Constitutional Declaration defines the Transitional Cabinet in similar terms, but gives the Prime Minister the right to choose the other members of the cabinet from a list provided to him or her by the FFC. The cabinet members are "confirmed by the Sovereignty Council".

Article 16.(a) of the Draft Constitutional Declaration requires the Prime Minister and members of Cabinet to be "Sudanese by birth", at least 25 years old, a clean police record for "crimes of honour".

Article 16.(b) excludes dual nationals from being a Minister of Defence, Interior, Foreign Affairs or Justice unless an exemption is agreed by the Sovereignty Council and the FFC for the position of Prime Minister, or by the Sovereignty Council and the Prime Minister for ministerial positions.

The transitional period ministers are forbidden under Article 19 of the Draft Constitutional Declaration from running in the planned 2022 Sudanese general election.

Prime minister
Abdalla Hamdok, a Sudanese public administrator who served in numerous international administrative positions during the late twentieth and early twenty-first centuries, was nominated by the FFC as Prime Minister and formally sworn in on 21 August 2019.

Women's participation
On 18 August 2019, the Sudanese Women's Union stated that women had not been consulted in the preparation of a list of candidates for ministerial posts for the 2019–2022 Transitional Cabinet, and that few women were among the candidates. Women in senior positions in the transitional period institutions include  Aisha Musa el-Said and Raja Nicola in the Sovereignty Council of Sudan.

The Sudanese Women's Union argued that women had played as significant a role as men in the political changes of 2019 and that Sudanese women "claim an equal share of 50-50 with men at all levels, measured by qualifications and capabilities".

Women Ministers in the Hamdok Cabinet include Asma Mohamed Abdalla as Foreign Minister, Lena el-Sheikh Mahjoub as Minister of Social Development and Labour, Wala'a Essam al-Boushi as Minister for Youth and Sports, Intisar el-Zein Soughayroun as Minister of Higher Education.

Budget
The al-Bashir annual national budgets mostly funded Sudanese security and other armed forces (70 percent in 2016), with the 2018 budget allocating 3 percent to education. In November 2019, a plan to raise the fraction of the budget allocated to education to 20 percent was announced.

Ministers of the Hamdok Cabinet
In September 2019, 20 ministries were planned.

References

External links
Ministry of the Cabinet Affairs, Republic of Sudan

 
Sudan, Cabinet
Government of Sudan